Hasamba 3G (lit. Hasamba Third Generation) is a television series that broadcast on the IsraelI channels HOT3 and Arutz HaYeladim.

Background: The original series
A group of girls and boys set up a secret society called "Hasamba"; their adventures take place, first during the British Mandate and the struggle for statehood of Israel, and then as they battle their country's enemies: infiltrators, spies, criminals and other offenders. Though suspenseful, the writing is entertaining, with humor, as well as informative. It emphasizes loyalty, friendship, dedication, and courage.

Yaron Zahavi (the handsome guy) and his deputy, Tamar (the pretty girl), are the first leaders of Hasamba. Later they are replaced by Yoav Tzur and his deputy, Rachel, Which are not mentioned in the series.

The format of each story is similar: Hasamba's leader explains the situation and delegates tasks to each member. One member is captured and successfully escapes with help from the outside. The bad guys are punished and there is a happy end.
Their secret meeting place is a real location in Tel Aviv, known as "The Electric Cave", which upon returning from a long stay abroad, the author discovered to be destroyed for the sake of building the Tel Aviv Hilton Hotel.

All in all were published 44 books in the series, when the last one ("Hasamba's heroes beat again!!") Was written in 1994, the year of death of Mossinson. Hasamba books, especially the first sixteen books, were very popular among the youth and adults in the first two decades of Israel, and constituted an integral part of Israeli culture at that time.

Plot
The series tells the story of a group Hasamba, over 50 years after the creation, when they are around the age of 70. Tamar and Yaron married and they had a son named Uri, who was killed for some reason (so they think). Their granddaughter, Renen, lived with them after the death of her father. The real story on Renen's father, was Discovered in the first episode: Sunny Zorkin, CEO of Israel's largest cellular communications company, "Zorcom", grabbed it after guarding state secrets. In a failed attempt to change his memoirs, escaping one of the scientists in order to Tamar Zehavi the information was shelved her all that much years. Sonny sends a group of kidnappers to abduct the Tamar. Yaron, who finds it, tries to unify Hasamba.

Thus the 70-year-old Hasamba gets dragged back into the action one by one. But they're not alone: Several guys and girls of the younger and fresher generation: Yuval, Luda, Iggy, Chofni and Renen find themselves involved and become Hasamba's third-generation counterparts.

See also
Hasamba - The books (by Yigal Mossinson) on which the series was based.
 Yigal Mossinson

External links 
 

Israeli drama television series
Hot (Israel)
2010 Israeli television series debuts
2013 Israeli television series endings